The Biak myzomela (Myzomela rubrobrunnea) is a species of bird in the family Meliphagidae. It was formerly considered a subspecies of the dusky myzomela (	Myzomela obscura), but was split as a distinct species by the IOC in 2021. It is found in Biak. Its natural habitat is subtropical or tropical moist lowland forests.

References

Biak myzomela
Biak myzomela
Biak myzomela